Helicops polylepis, Norman's keelback, is a species of snake in the family Colubridae. It is found in Brazil, Colombia, Peru, and Bolivia.

References 

Helicops]
Snakes of South America
Reptiles of Brazil
Reptiles of Colombia
Reptiles of Peru
Reptiles of Bolivia
Reptiles described in 1861
Taxa named by Albert Günther